Rear Admiral David Animle Hansen (17 May 1923 – 28 January 2008) was a Ghanaian naval officer who served as Chairman of the Greater Accra Regional Administrative Committee from 1966 to 1967. He previously served as  Commander of the Ghana Navy from 1962 to 1966. He was the first Ghanaian to be appointed head of the Ghana Navy. Hansen was also the founding director of the National Vocational Training Institute from 1970 to 1980.

Early life and education 
Hansen was born on 17 May 1923 in Accra to John William Kojo Hansen and Joanna Nora Hansen. He began schooling at the Accra Royal School and continued to the Osu Presbyterian Senior School. He attended Accra Academy and graduated in 1942. Upon completion, Hansen worked briefly for Ghana Post before enlisting into the army two years after his high school graduation. Hansen trained at the Eaton Hall Officer Cadet School  in the United Kingdom in 1950. In 1951, he attended the platoon weapon training course at Hythe in Kent. He underwent the platoon commander's course in 1954 at Warminster and in the following year trained at the Infantry Signal School. In 1959, he enrolled at the Staff College, Camberley.

Career
Following his secondary education and brief work experience, he enlisted into the Gold Coast Regiment in 1944.
On the completion of his training, Hansen was commissioned into the Gold Coast Regiment of the Royal West African Frontier Force, on 20 January 1951. In 1958, he became one of the original officers of the Ghana Regiment, when the Gold Coast gained its independence. He was then selected to transfer from the Ghana Army, to be a founding officer of the new Ghana Navy.  

When the Ghana Navy was established on 29 July 1959, its first head was D. A. Foreman, a retired British naval officer. He was commissioned as a Ghana Navy officer, with the rank of Commodore, to give the new service a proper naval grounding. David Hansen worked alongside him, combining his own Ghanaian military experience with Foreman's Royal Navy expertise to give the new service its own distinct ethos and identity. Hansen was duly appointed as the first Ghanaian Chief of Naval Staff of the Ghana Navy and retired with the flag rank of Rear Admiral. 

In addition, he served as an aide-de-camp to President Kwame Nkrumah.

Honours
The Ghana Navy ship GNS Hansen was named after him.

References

1923 births
2008 deaths
Ghanaian soldiers
Ghana Navy personnel
Ga-Adangbe people
Chiefs of Naval Staff (Ghana)
Alumni of the Accra Academy
Ghanaian expatriates in the United Kingdom